is a Japanese former football player.

Playing career
He started his professional career with Kashima Antlers in 1999 and during his times with Kashima Antlers he has been on loan to Vissel Kobe in 2005, Avispa Fukuoka in 2006-2007 and Nagoya Grampus Eight in 2007 before returning to Kashima Antlers in 2008 and was released by the club at the end of the season. He never played in a single league game during the 2007 or 2008 seasons while on loan to Nagoya Grampus Eight, Avispa Fukuoka, or with the Kashima Antlers.

From 2009 to 2013 he played for Singapore's S.League club Tampines Rovers and was one of their key players, except when he played one season for Mitra Kukar in 2012.  Kaneko then moved to Ang Thong in Thailand in 2014, and then to Yangon United FC in Myanmar in 2015.

Club statistics

Honours

Club honours
Kashima Antlers
J1 League (3): 2000, 2001, 2008
J.League Cup (2): 2000, 2002
Emperor's Cup (1): 2000

Tampines Rovers
S.League (1): 2011
Singapore Charity Shield (1): 2011

References

External links

1980 births
Living people
Association football people from Fukuoka Prefecture
Japanese footballers
J1 League players
J2 League players
Kashima Antlers players
Vissel Kobe players
Avispa Fukuoka players
Nagoya Grampus players
Japanese expatriate footballers
Singapore Premier League players
Tampines Rovers FC players
Liga 1 (Indonesia) players
Mitra Kukar players
Seiji Kaneko
Yangon United F.C. players
Expatriate footballers in Singapore
Expatriate footballers in Indonesia
Expatriate footballers in Thailand
Expatriate footballers in Myanmar
Footballers at the 1998 Asian Games
Association football defenders
Asian Games competitors for Japan